The Halifax District Brigade was an administrative division of the North Carolina militia during the American Revolutionary War (1776–1783).  This unit was established by the North Carolina Provincial Congress on May 4, 1776, and disbanded at the end of the war.

Commanders
Brigadier Allen Jones served as commander of the Halifax District Brigade from May 4, 1776, until after the war when he resigned his commission on December 3, 1787.   Thomas Eaton temporarily filled general Jones command while he represented as North Carolina delegate to the Continental Congress in December 1779 and again while he was ill in 1781.
Brigadier General Allen Jones (1776-1783)
Brigadier General Thomas Eaton (Pro Tempore) (1779, 1781)

Regiments

1st and 2nd Battalion of Volunteers
The North Carolina Provincial Congress authorized the creation of the 1st and 2nd Battalion of Volunteers on November 23, 1776, at the insistence of the Continental Congress, which was afraid of another British march to  Charleston.  The hastily assembled 1st and 2nd Battalion of Volunteers were assigned to Brigadier General Allen Jones of the newly created Halifax District Brigade of the North Carolina militia.  Colonel Abraham Sheppard commanded the 1st Battalion and Lieutenant Colonel Francis Locke commanded the 2nd Battalion. They marched into South Carolina but the British failed to invade a second time.  The term limits for these two battalions expired on April 10, 1777, so the units returned home because they were no longer needed.

Edgecombe County Regiment
The Edgecombe County Regiment was one of 35 existing North Carolina county militias to be authorized for organization on September 9, 1775, by the North Carolina Provincial Congress.  All officers were appointed and commissioned by the provincial congress.   This unit was active until the end of the war in 1783.  The colonels and commandants of the regiment included:
 Colonel William Haywood (1775-1776, commandant)
 Colonel Exum Lewis (1776-1783, commandant)
 Colonel Jonas Johnston (1778-1779, 2nd colonel)
 Colonel Joseph J. Clinch (1779-1783, 2nd colonel)

Franklin County Regiment
When Franklin County was created out of part of Bute County on January 30, 1779, the Bute County Regiment was abolished and replace with the Franklin County Regiment.  All officers were selected and commissioned by the Governor.   The colonels and commandants of the regiment included:
 Colonel Benjamin Seawell (1779-1783, commandant)
 Colonel William Brickell (1781-1783, 2nd colonel)

Halifax County Regiment
The Halifax County Regiment was one of 35 existing North Carolina county militias to be authorized for organization on September 9, 1775, by the North Carolina Provincial Congress.  All officers were appointed and commissioned by the provincial congress.   This unit was active until the end of the war in 1783.  The colonels and commandants of the regiment included:
 Colonel John Bradford (1775-1776)
 Colonel Willis Alston (1776-1778)
 Colonel Samuel Weldon (1778)
 Colonel John Whitaker (1779-1780)
 Colonel James Allen (1780-1783)

Nash County Regiment
When the North Carolina General Assembly Created Nash County from Edgecombe County on December 17, 1777, the also created the Nash County Regiment of the North Carolina militia.  All officers were selected and commissioned by the Governor.  The unit was active until the end of the war.  The colonels and commandants of this regiment included:
 Colonel James Clinch (1777-1783)
 Colonel Thomas Hunter (1780-1783, 2nd colonel)

Northampton County Regiment
The Northampton County Regiment was one of 35 existing North Carolina county militias to be authorized for organization on September 9, 1775, by the North Carolina Provincial Congress.  All officers were appointed and commissioned by the provincial congress.   This unit was active until the end of the war in 1783.  The colonels and commandants of the regiment included:
 Colonel Allen Jones (1775-1776), promoted to command of brigade
 Colonel William Eaton (1776-1780)
 Colonel Howell Edmunds (1780)
 Colonel Jeptha Atherton (1775-1783)
 Colonel Andrew Haynes (1781-1783, 2nd colonel)

Engagements
Regiments of the Halifax District Brigade were involved in 22 known engagements (battles, sieges, and skirmishes), including two in George, 11 in South Carolina, 8 in North Carolina, and one in Florida.  One or more companies of these regiments were involved in each engagement.

References

North Carolina militia
1776 establishments in North Carolina